Prodromos (Greek for "forerunner") may refer to:

 a title of John the Baptist
 Prodromoi, a light cavalry unit in Ancient Greece
 Prodromos, Paros
 Prodromos, Cyprus
 Prodromos (neighborhood in Larnaca), Cyprus
 Prodromus, a preliminary publication
 Prodromos, Mount Athos, an Athonite skete belonging to the Great Lavra Monastery
 Prodromos Monastery, in Arcadia

Notable people
 Theodore Prodromos ( 1100 – c. 1168), Byzantine writer
 Prodromos Bodosakis-Athanasiadis (1890–1979), Greek businessman
 Prodromos Dreliozis (born 1975), Greek basketball player
 Prodromos Kathiniotis, Greek television celebrity and singer
 Prodromos Meravidis (1910–1981), Greek film director
 Prodromos Nikolaidis (born 1978), Greek-Cypriot basketball player
 Prodromos Tsaousakis (1919–1979), Greek singer, songwriter, and composer

See also
 Prodromou, a related surname